The San Juan 21 is an American trailerable sailboat, that was designed by Don Clark as and first built in 1970.

Production
The design was built by the Clark Boat Company in Kent, Washington, United States, but it is now out of production. A total of 2600 San Juan 21s were completed.

The design was introduced at the 1970 Seattle Boat Show and was well received.

Design
The San Juan 21 is a recreational keelboat, built predominantly of fiberglass, with wood trim. It has a fractional sloop rig, a raked stem, a slightly reverse transom, a transom-hung rudder controlled by a tiller and a centerboard keel.

The boat is normally fitted with a small  outboard motor for docking and maneuvering.

The design has sleeping accommodation for four people, with a double "V"-berth in the bow cabin and two quarter berths in the main cabin under the cockpit. The head is located just aft of the bow cabin on the starboard side.

For sailing downwind the design may be equipped with a symmetrical spinnaker.

Variants
San Juan 21 or Mark I
This model was introduced in 1970 and produced until 1977. It carries  of ballast. The boat has a PHRF racing average handicap of 252 with a high of 246 and low of 258.

San Juan 21-2 or Mark II
This model was introduced in 1974 after about 1,000 of the Mark Is had been built. The Mark II has a raised deck over top of the cabin and as smaller cockpit, with a commensurately larger cabin. The Mark II was produced alongside the Mark I until Mark I production ended in 1977. The boat has a PHRF racing average handicap of 252 with a high of 267 and low of 240.

Operational history
The boat is supported by an active class club that organizes racing events, the San Juan 21 Class Association.

In a 2010 review Steve Henkel wrote, "the SJ21 has a very active racing association, unusual for a boat designed 30-plus years ago. An efficient foil-shaped rudder and swing keel, plus a sailcloth slot gasket, offer superior hydrodynamics compared with her comps. Worst features: The slot gasket, made of sailcloth (which bridges the gap across the trunk slot to prevent turbulence when sailing downwind with the keel raised), requires special maintenance (trimming of frayed edges and periodic replacement) to keep it smooth and effective. The advertised weight of 1,250 pounds may be low; some owners claim weights of 1,500 to 1,750 pounds."

See also
List of sailing boat types

Similar sailboats
Cal 20
Core Sound 20 Mark 3
Flicka 20
Halman 20
Hunter 19 (Europa)
Hunter 20
Hunter 212
Hunter 216
Mistral T-21
Paceship 20
Sandpiper 565
Santana 20
Sirius 22

References

External links

Keelboats
1970s sailboat type designs
Sailing yachts
Trailer sailers
Sailboat type designs by Don Clark
Sailboat types built by Clark Boat Company